Helvey is an unincorporated community in Jefferson County, Nebraska, United States.

History
A post office was established at Helvey in the 1890s. It was named for Thomas Helvey, a pioneer settler.

References

Unincorporated communities in Jefferson County, Nebraska
Unincorporated communities in Nebraska